Lava Cola (officially Lava Cola – Vanuatu Kava Cola) is a cola drink produced in Vanuatu by Vanuatu Beverage Ltd. It contains a kavalactone additive, kava consumption being traditionally important in western Pacific nations. Lava Cola has been described as an "anti-energy drink". Australian media have noted that it "produces the calming effect of kava without the muddy taste," adding that, while kava itself is an acquired taste, Lava Cola may well be suitable for export.

The cola began as a syrupy "water-based kava extract" developed by Australian-born James Armitage in 2009. He then successfully approached Vanuatu Beverage to suggest blending it with cola. The watery kava syrup is "added to cola in a proportion of 15 millilitres to a bottle of 330 ml". The drink is now produced in a factory on the outskirts of Port Vila, the country's capital. It went into production for the domestic market in October 2009. Lava Cola uses kava produced on the island of Maewo, which has generated an increase in revenues for local producers. Vanuatu Beverage hopes to export the drink first to Fiji and New Caledonia, then to a wider market.

See also 
 Mary Jane's Relaxing Soda

References

External links
 Vanuatu Kava Store

Cola brands
Kava
Relaxation drinks
Vanuatuan culture
Vanuatuan cuisine
Products introduced in 2009
Vanuatuan inventions